Fodbold Club Fredericia af 1991 (simply known as FC Fredericia), is a professional association football club based in the town of Fredericia, Denmark, that competes in the Danish 1st Division, the second tier of the Danish football league system. Founded in 1991 as a merger between Fredericia fF and Fredericia KFUM, it is affiliated to DBU Jutland. The team plays its home matches at Fredericia Stadium, named Monjasa Park for sponsorship reasons, where it has been based since 2006.

In 2002, Fredericia fF pulled out of the merger, which means that FC Fredericia today continues to be the professional branch of Fredericia KFUM. Despite this, FC Fredericia has enjoyed considerable success since its foundation as they have risen through the pyramid; from their inception when they competed in the Denmark Series, the fourth tier of Danish football to today, where they have established themselves in the second tier.

History

Early history 
FC Fredericia was officially established on 3 January 1991 at two extraordinary general meetings in Fredericia fF and Fredericia KFUM, respectively. Members overwhelmingly supported an agreement of cooperation between the two clubs, which their respective boards had previously agreed to. With effect from 1 January 1991, FC Fredericia became reality. The merger was in fact a superstructure between Fredericia's two highest ranked teams, competing in the Denmark Series, the fourth tier of the Danish football league system, and Series 1, a regional division which is the sixth level in the pyramid. The formation of a professional club by uniting the best teams of the town, two former rivals even, was supported unequivocally by sponsors and Fredericia Municipality.

The club reached promotion to the Danish 2nd Division, the third tier, in its inaugural season. In the 1994–95 season, Fredericia qualified for promotion play-offs after ending third in the promotion group of the 2nd Division West. After facing AC Horsens over two legs, which ended 3–3 and 1–1, respectively, Fredericia reached promotion to the Danish 1st Division, the third tier, on away goals.

In 2002, Fredericia fF pulled out of the project, so as of 2003 FC Fredericia continued to be the professional branch of Fredericia KFUM. In the autumn of 2005, they won the first edition of the former Fionia Bank Cup, beating out Kolding FC and Vejle Boldklub on goal difference. The following year, Fredericia moved into their new home ground, Fredericia Stadium.

New ambitions 
The club achieved its highest ever league position, third in the second tier, under Peter Sørensen in 2009–10, only missing out on promotion to the Danish Superliga by three points. In the following seasons, after Sørensen was appointed manager for AGF, Fredericia again became a midtable side. A high point, however, occurred in the 2012–13 season where the club found themselves in the race for promotion after a highly successful autumn. However, a series of poor results in the spring saw coach Thomas Thomasberg sacked in April 2013, and the club finished the season in fifth place; out of reach of promotion.

During the 2017–18 season, FC Fredericia went on a historic run in the Danish Cup, knocking out AGF (1–0), HB Køge (2–0) and AaB (3–1) en route to the semi-finals, in which the club faced Silkeborg IF in a home game on 25 April 2018. In front of 3,905 spectators at Monjasa Park, the club lost 0–1 after an own goal by Oliver Fredsted.

In May 2020, Fredericia Municipality announced at a press conference plans for upgrading Monjasa Park. A new stand with a seating capacity of 1,400 and terracing able to hold 500 away-fans were planned for construction before the end of the year. The plans would see stadium infrastructure improve and prepare FC Fredericia for a possible future promotion to the Danish Superliga, which mayor Jacob Bjerregaard stated could happen within the "next 2–3 years". The announcement came at a point where the Danish Football Union had suspended the Danish leagues, including the Danish 1st Division due to the coronavirus pandemic. At that point, the team, coached by Jonas Dal were third in the league, nine points from archrivals Vejle Boldklub in the promotion spot.

Players

Current squad

Notable former players 

  Kim Nørholt

Backroom staff

Club officials 

Source: FC Fredericia | Bestyrelsen

Source: FC Fredericia | Holdet

Honours

Domestic

National leagues 
 Second Highest Danish League2
 Third place (2): 2002–03, 2009–10
 Third Highest Danish League3
 Best league performance:Runners-up (2): 1998–99, 2000–01 
 Fourth Highest Danish League4
 Group 3 Winners (1): 1991

Cups 
 DBU Pokalen
 Best cup performance:Semi-finals (1): 2017–18

 2: Level 2: 1. Division (1991–present)
 3: Level 3: 2. Division (1991–present)
 4: Level 4: Danmarksserien for herrer (1966–present)

See also
Fionia Bank Cup

References

External links
FC Fredericia official website
clubfacts at the Danish Football Union database

 
Fredericia, FC
Fredericia Municipality
Association football clubs established in 1991
1991 establishments in Denmark
Sports clubs founded by the YMCA
Fredericia